Yaran (also Romanized as Yārān) is a village in Ban Zardeh Rural District, in the Central District of Dalahu County, Kermanshah Province, Iran. At the 2006 census, its population was 191, in 35 families.

References 

Populated places in Dalahu County